Brotherly Love is a 2015 American drama film written and directed by Jamal Hill. The film stars Keke Palmer, Cory Hardrict, Eric D. Hill and Quincy Brown. The film was executive produced by Queen Latifah for her production company Flavor Unit Films, Electric Republic and Jacavi Film. Brotherly Love was distributed by Freestyle Releasing and had a limited theatrical release in the United States on April 24, 2015.

Plot

Set in the city of Philadelphia and famed Overbrook High School, Brotherly Love follows star high school basketball player Sergio Taylor (Hill) as he struggles navigating the fame that comes with being a star athlete. Sergio's older brother June (Hardrict) saw his own basketball dreams fade away when he turned to the streets to provide for his family after the death of their father. Sergio's twin sister Jackie (Palmer) saw her ambitions of having a music career side tracked after unexpectedly falling in love with Chris (Quincy Brown).
    
It starts with the brutal killing of five hill boys hanging out. Junior “June” for short, wakes up and prepares Sergio for the day giving him some money. When they get to school Jackie (Keke Palmer) meets up with her two best friends Trina and Simone who is dating and has a child with June. They briefly talk about a boy named Chris from the hill and the upcoming school dance before Jackie goes off to the library. While there, Jackie meets Chris and he offers to drive her home, despite the warning that she is June's sister. When she gets home she is accosted by her mother, who is dealing with addiction since her father's passing.
   
While rolling dice, June gets into a fight with Zip's cousin who declares the neighborhood for the hill until the mystery gun man is found. Sergio's friend, Dez tells Sergio and Sean about a plan to break in and steal some items from a house up the hill. Sean shows a bit of interest while Sergio is hesitant. Sergio is conflicted and he goes to his uncle Ron's barber shop for advice. Uncle Ron tells him that every child in Philadelphia has the potential but what they lack is the focus, he shouldn't end up like his father or brother he tells him. “your talent doesn’t determine your fate your action does”.

Jackie is on her date with Chris who shows up late but makes up for it, when he surprises her by getting her studio time to record a song he wrote for her. Sergio meets up with June for late night practice. He literates his fears, June encourages him and reminds him of their plan to make it and leave the hood for good. Meanwhile, one of June's best friends Bunch is ambushed and killed.

While returning from the court just outside their house, June and Sergio are ambushed. Sergio escapes but June is held and drag into the house down to the basement where he sleeps, and is robbed of all the money he had been saving. While getting dragged out, his mother comes down the stairs and is shot by one of the assailants. They continue dragging June out who is struggling, alerting the neighbors who come outside, forcing the assailants to abandon June in the street.

Meanwhile, Jackie returns from her date with Chris and sees the police cars outside her home. She rushes to June, who tells her her mother had been shot and is on the way to the hospital. June gets angry when he sees Chris and tells him to leave. Sergio, June and Peanut (Bunch's brother) are together when June gets a call informing him about Bunch's killing.

Time passes as their mother heals. Jackie and Chris continue to see each other. Jackie finds out she is pregnant and keeps it to herself. Sergio considers Dez's plan because he wants to help with the money problems. June warns Jackie to quit seeing Chris because of the war going on between them and the hill, she refuses stating the fact that it has nothing to do with her and Chris.

June has a discussion with his mother, who says he has always been there for them showing strength and endurance. She tells him to look after himself and ease up on Jackie because she will end up despising him. Sergio wins his basketball season and June holds a surprise party in his favor. While at the party, Chris is outside saying he has information that might help June in finding the people responsible for shooting his mother and killing Bunch. Grateful, June quickly invites Chris in for the party. That night after the party June and Peanut follow the lead and end up killing them.

They all prepare for the brook ball school dance. Chris and Jackie end up going together and they win prom king and queen. Dez and Sean convince Sergio, who is reluctant, to go steal from the house. He eventually agrees. They enter the house through the back door with the key Dez stole from the house some weeks earlier.

They split up, Dez and Sean go carry the flat screen to the car, while Sergio goes upstairs for the jewelry and money. Unbeknownst to them, the house alarm had been triggered and the police arrive. While upstairs Sergio opens the drawers and takes nothing. Dez and Sean, while loading the TV in the car, get arrested. The officer enters the home sees and recognizes Sergio and sets him free, declaring the house clear.

Meanwhile, at the dance June takes Chris outside and Jackie tells him when he comes back she has something to tell him. June expresses his gratitude, gives him money with no strings attached, and promises to look after him. Chris says he didn't mean to fall in love with Jackie and pulls out a gun and shoots June dead. It is revealed that Chris was there the night of the hill boys shooting and his cousin Omar was killed. June is revealed to be the mystery shooter.

Having survived such an ordeal, Chris swore revenge. He sought after Jackie. Before their studio date he arranged the hit on Bunch and June, hence his late arrival. Chris tries to flee, but is trapped by the police and surrenders. Jackie is called outside by Simone to find June dead, as Sergio arrives.

Two years later Sergio has taken up the role of June and has a successful career in basketball, living in a big mansion with his mother, Jackie and her daughter. He hands Jackie a letter written by Chris from prison. Jackie reads the letter which states Chris is full of regret, expressing how he loved Omar the way she loved June, how he wishes he never killed June because he put them through the same type of pain. He wishes how they could’ve been married and even had a kid because he still loves her even if he never told her and tells her to live her dreams. Jackie cries while reading the letter. Sergio is at June's gravesite, before he enters his Bentley and drives off.

Cast
Keke Palmer as Jackie
Cory Hardrict as June
Quincy Brown as Chris
Eric D. Hill Jr. as Sergio
Romeo Miller as Sean
Logan Browning as Trina
Macy Gray as Mrs. Taylor
Malik Yoba as Coach
Faizon Love as Uncle Ron
Jay Lewis as Peanut
Marc John Jefferies as Bunch

See also
French language: Brotherly Love (film)
List of black films of the 2010s
List of hood films

References

External links
 
 
 

2015 films
American drama films
American basketball films
Films set in Philadelphia
Films shot in Philadelphia
2010s English-language films
2010s American films